James or Jimmy Norman may refer to:
James Norman (author), Australian columnist and author
James B. Norman (born 1952), American photographer, author, and cultural historian
James O'Higgins Norman (born 1968), Irish sociologist, author and academic
James Thomas Norman (born 1934), American football offensive lineman
Jimmy Norman (1937–2011), American rhythm and blues and jazz musician and a songwriter
Jimmy Norman (Galway Bay FM) (born 1970), Irish radio presenter

See also
Jim Norman (disambiguation)